Helena Saeed is the first ever Pakistani female Additional Inspector General police and hails from Quetta, Balochistan, Pakistan. She belongs to the Christian minority community of Balochistan.

Reference

Living people
Year of birth missing (living people)
People from Quetta